Stenocyathidae is a family of corals belonging to the order Scleractinia.

Genera:
 Pedicellocyathus Cairns, 1995
 Stenocyathus Pourtalès, 1871
 Truncatoguynia Cairns, 1989

References

Scleractinia
Cnidarian families